Tony Ballantyne (born 1972) is a British science-fiction author known for his debut trilogy of novels, titled Recursion, Capacity and Divergence. He is also Assistant Headteacher and an Information Technology teacher at The Blue Coat School, Oldham and has been nominated for the BSFA Award for short fiction.

Bibliography

Novels 

 Dream London, Solaris, 2013
 Dream Paris, Solaris, 2015

Recursion Trilogy
 Recursion, Macmillan, 2004
 Capacity, Macmillan, 2005
 Divergence, Macmillan, 2007

The Robot Wars / Penrose
 Twisted Metal, Macmillan, 2009
 Blood and Iron, Macmillan, 2010
 Stories from the Northern Road, Macmillan, 2012

Short fiction 
Stories

 "Why are Rocks?" – Hub Issue 40, edited by Lee Harris
 "Matthew's Passion" (with Eric Brown) – Kethani by Eric Brown (Solaris, 2008)
 "Third Person" – The Solaris Book of New Science Fiction, edited by George Mann (Solaris, 2007); Reprinted in The Year's Best SF 13, edited by David Hartwell and Kathryn Cramer
 "Aristotle OS" – Fast Forward 1, edited by Lou Anders (PYR, 2007); Reprinted in THE YEAR's BEST SF 13, edited by David Hartwell and Kathryn Cramer
 "The Exchange" – Postscripts 7
 "The Robot and the Octopus" – Nemonymous 5
 "A Matter of Mathematics" – The Mammoth Book of Jules Verne Adventures, edited by Mike Ashley and Eric Brown
 "Star!" – Constellations, edited by Peter Crowther (DAW, 2005)
 "The Ugly Truth" – Interzone 191
 "The Waters of Meribah" – Interzone189; Reprinted in THE YEAR's BEST SF 9, edited by David Hartwell and Kathryn Cramer
 "Teaching the War Robot to Dance" – Interzone 178
 "Real Man" – Interzone 174
 "Indecisive Weapons" – Interzone 172
 "Restoring the Balance, 2" – Interzone 168
 "Restoring the Balance" – Interzone 167
 "A New Beginning" – Interzone 163
 "Single Minded" – Interzone 162
 "The Blue Magnolia" – The Third Alternative 22; Reprinted in the Mammoth Book of Comic Fantasy, edited by Mike Ashley
 "Soldier.exe" – Interzone 144
 "Gorillagram" – Interzone 139
 "The Sixth VNM" – Interzone 138

References

External links
 
 
 Tony Ballantyne's online fiction at Free Speculative Fiction Online
 Talking to The Machines: An Interview With Tony Ballantyne, The Agony Column for 28 June 2004, Interview Conducted by Rick Kleffel
 The Recursive Man: an interview with Tony Ballantyne by Eric Brown
 Story Behind Dream London - Online Essay by Tony Ballantyne

1972 births
Living people
Analog Science Fiction and Fact people
British science fiction writers
British male novelists
People from County Durham